Savar Cantonment is a cantonment located in Savar, Dhaka, Bangladesh. The 9th infantry division of Bangladesh Army is garrisoned there.  Corps of Military Police Centre & School (CMPC&S) and the Savar Golf Club (SGC) are also located in the cantonment.

History 
Before 1971, the area was known as 'Ansar Camp' and during Bangladesh Liberation War the camp was used for Razakar by Pakistani Army. After the independence it was main training center for Jatiya Rakkhi Bahini which would be absorbed into Bangladesh Army in 1976. Since 1976 it is given to Bangladesh Army to use as their cantonment.

Soldiers stationed in Savar cantonment supported the president during the 1976 Bangladesh coup d'état attempt and helped prevent the coup from being successful. They took defensive positions around Dhaka and prevent arrival of coup supporters from Mymensingh Cantonment. 

In 2001, Savar Golf Club, located on a 68.8 acre site in the cantonment, was expanded 18 holes. Aside from the Golf Club it has the Savar Cantonment Shooting Club.

Injured victims from Rana Plaza accident were treated at Savar CMH.

Prime Minister Sheikh Hasina awarded the National Standard Award to the Corps of Military Police (CMP) Centre and School located in Savar Cantonment on 23 November 2017.

Training facilities 
 Formation Driving Track
 Savar Small Arms Firing Range
 Trust Technical Training Institute
Corps of Military Police (CMP) Centre and School

Education 
 Army Institute of Business Administration (Army IBA)
 Morning Glory School and College
 Proyash School
 Savar Cantonment Board Boys High School
 Savar Cantonment Board Girls High School
 Savar Cantonment Public School and College
 Sena Public School & College, Savar

See also 
 Bangladesh Armed Forces
 Bangladesh Army
Savar DOHS

References 

Cantonments of Bangladesh